Cosmic Carnage is a 1994 fighting video game developed by Almanic Corporation, in conjunction with ALU, and published by Sega exclusively for the 32X add-on. Set in an uncharted star system, the game follows eight fighters from two factions in a struggle for survival. Its gameplay consists of one-on-one fights, with a main six-button configuration, featuring special moves and finisher techniques, as well as two playable modes. The title garnered mostly negative reception from critics since its release.

Gameplay 

Cosmic Carnage is a fighting game similar to Mortal Kombat. The player fights against other opponents in one-on-one matches and the fighter who manages to deplete the health bar of the opponent wins the first bout. The first to win two bouts becomes the winner of the match. Each round is timed, which can be adjusted or deactivated in the game options; if both fighters still have health remaining when time expires, the fighter with more health wins the round. The game features five levels of difficulty. Hidden characters can be played via cheat code.

In single-player mode, players can choose from eight playable characters and fight against computer-controlled fighters. Achieving a ‘good ending’ for a fighter is time based; depending on how fast the player kills opponents, the more time there is left to escape to the life pod and get as far away as possible. Like Mortal Kombat, special and death moves are performed by entering button commands while pressing the d-pad. A notable feature is the ability to customize a character prior to matches; Four of the selectable characters use armor to assist them in battle and players may choose between one of two options (‘light’ or ‘heavy’) for each of the three armors (body, leg and arm), each providing characters with their own special move. Similar to the Samurai Shodown franchise, the camera zooms in or out to maximize or minimize the level of graphical detail depending on character movement.

Synopsis 
In an uncharted star system, a group of prisoners en route to a celestial space mine overpower the ship's guards and take control of the ship, but during their breakout, most of the ship's controls are damaged. After days of drifting, the criminals realize that their only hope is to hijack another ship and use their distress signal to bring a military ship to their aid. They then trick the ship by ramming their own vehicle into it. The impact, however, badly damages both and destroys all but one of the escape pods, as well as killing all but four from each ship (eight in total). The few survivors fight for the final escape pod and a chance of survival.

Characters 
All soldiers use Light Armor and can be equipped with Heavy Armor before fights, while none of the fugitives use armor.
 Cylic – An alien red ant. In the Japanese version, he is a brown-haired human soldier named Jake.
 Zena-Lan – A female soldier whose head is constantly on fire. In the Japanese version, she is a blond-haired human soldier named Ray.
 Naruto – A shadow being. In the Japanese version, he is a brown-haired human.
 Tyr – A man with metallic skin wearing samurai like armor.
Talmac – A tall, dark, sinister figure with a skull-like face, spiked red hair and sharp claws. No one is sure if he wears a mask or not, because no one has gotten close enough to find out.
Yug – A gorilla-like humanoid who is possibly a robot. He relies almost entirely on his powerful arms for his attacks.
Naja – A female snake-shaped siren, with a cobra's head and, instead of legs, a long tail that she uses as a battering ram. Her design and American name are derived from the serpentine nāga of Hinduism and Buddhism, which in sculptures and drawn art were often depicted as having humanoid torsos.
Deamon – A vicious alien with large talon-like claws and a scorpion-like stinger attached to the back of his head.

Development and release 
Cosmic Carnage was developed by Almanic Corporation in conjunction with ALU. Takashi Shichijo and Hikoshi Hashimoto served as the project's programmer and composer respectively, although neither are credited as such in the credits of the game. ALU stated on their official website that development kits arrived three months prior to release date during development. The game was first released for the 32X by Sega in North America as a launch title on 21 November 1994. Former Sega of America executive producer Michael Latham stated that the company was rushed to release games on time for the 32X's launch, and said that "hen Cosmic Carnage showed up, we didn't even want to ship it. It took a lot of convincing, you know, to ship that title." The title was then released in Japan on 27 January 1995 under the name Cyber Brawl and later in Europe on February of the same year.

Reception 

Cosmic Carnage received mostly negative reviews. The four reviewers of Electronic Gaming Monthly unanimously commented that even taking into account the fact that it is a launch title, Cosmic Carnage is a disappointing game which fails to push significantly beyond the capabilities of the standalone Sega Genesis in either graphics or audio. They did remark that the armor mechanic is an impressive innovation, but nonetheless felt that the overall gameplay was mediocre at best. In their review, GamePro praised the armor mechanic and sci-fi styled graphics, but criticized the slow action and limited originality, and concluded that "there are more exciting Genesis fighters around". Next Generation reviewed the game, rating it one star out of five, and stated that it was  "A sad, shambling mockery of a fighting game." Flux magazine  gave mostly a negative review saying: "Basically a second-rate fighting game with sluggish action, awful sound and overly detailed graphics that make it hard to determine just what the hell is going on."  Although they praised the characters and movesets.

Even Sega of America president Tom Kalinske declined to defend the game; when an interviewer brought up the negative response Cosmic Carnage was getting, Kalinske said only, "Well, you know, every now and then there are games with which we're not so happy. It's all part of the learning process."

In a retrospective review, Levi Buchanan of IGN applauded the character sprites, noting that they are "large, colorful, and decently detailed", but felt that the sprite detail were "ruined" by zooming effects. Buchanan also criticized the audio, which consists of "orrid, crunchy music and weak sound effects." Brett Alan Weiss of AllGame cited Cosmic Carnage as " poor cousin of such 2D fighters as Mortal Kombat and Street Fighter II", criticizing its slow gameplay and pixelated graphics.

See also 
 Eternal Champions

Notes

References

External links 
 Cosmic Carnage at GameFAQs
 Cosmic Carnage at Giant Bomb
 Cosmic Carnage at MobyGames

1994 video games
Fighting games
Givro Corporation games
Mortal Kombat clones
Multiplayer and single-player video games
Sega video games
Sega 32X games
Sega 32X-only games
Video games developed in Japan